Pan Asia Logistics has its headquarters located in Singapore. Services include air freight, ocean freight and logistics.

History 
Pan Asia Logistics was founded in Singapore by the German-born Christian Bischoff and the Singaporean Susan Tan.
Having previous experience at the German logistics company DB Schenker and Thyssen Haniel, Christian Bischoff started Pan Asia Logistics’ operations in February 2003 and achieved with 50 employees a revenue of $20 million by the end of the year.
In the following years the company expanded across the Asian Pacific region and established multiple offices in Singapore, Malaysia, Indonesia, Thailand, South Korea, Hong Kong, China, India, Taiwan, Vietnam, Japan and Germany. The company was awarded the 'Entrepreneur of the Year Award' 2010  and the 'Enterprise of the Year Award' 2012 in Singapore.

In 2018, Pan Asia Logistics has been acquired by TVS Asianics, the logistics subsidiary of the TVS Group

Subsidiaries & Warehouses  

2015 March - Official registration of Pan Asia Logistics Deutschland for both Germany offices on 20 March 2015.

2015 January - Registration of Pan Asia Logistics Trade Mark.

2014 September - Indonesia, Surabaya Office established

2014 September - Tuas Bay Drive warehouse completed on 16 September 2014 in Singapore. Gross floor area of 41,000 square meters.

2014 April - Iljuk warehouse completed on 17 April 2014 in Seoul Korea. Gross floor area of 20,000 square meters.

2014 February - PTP Malaysia warehouse completed on 27 February 2014 in Johor, Malaysia. Gross floor area of 40,000 square meters.

2013 December - Johor PTP branch office set up on 12 December 2013 in Johor, Malaysia

2013 August - Pan Asia Logistics Holdings Singapore Pte Ltd was incorporated on 29 August 2013 in Singapore.

2013 March - Guangzhou Branch Office set up on 25 March 2013 in Guangzhou, China.

2013 February - Beijing Branch Office set up on 6 February 2013 in Beijing, China.

2012 June - Pan Asia Logistics Malaysia PTP Sdn Bhd was incorporated on 14 June 2012 in Malaysia.

2012 March - Japan Branch Office set up on 1 March 2012 in Japan.

2012 January - Pan Asia Logistics International Pte. Ltd. was incorporated on 27 January 2012 in Singapore.

2011 May - Changi North warehouse and office building was completed on 13 May 2011 in Singapore. Gross floor area of 18,300 square meters

2011 February - Pan Asia Freight Forwarding & Logistics India Private Limited was incorporated on 24 February 2011 in Mumbai and Ahmedabad, India.

2010 November - Pan Asia Logistics Taiwan Limited was incorporated on 9 November 2010 in Taipei, Taiwan.

2009 September - Pan Asia Logistics Vietnam Corporation was incorporated on 4 September 2009 in Ho Chi Minh and Hanoi, Vietnam.

2009 August - Pan Asia Container Line Private Limited was incorporated on 28 August 2009 in Hong Kong

2005 December - Pan Asia Logistics Malaysia Sdn Bhd was incorporated on 5 December 2005 in Kuala Lumpur, Malaysia.

2005 June - A-License in China obtained.

2004 August - Beijing Representative Office was incorporated on 20 August 2004 in Beijing, China, now a Branch office of PAL Shanghai.

2004 April - Shanghai Representative office was incorporated on 14 April 2004 in Shanghai, China, now a wholly owned Foreign Enterprise.

2004 March - Pan Asia Logistics (Thailand) Limited was incorporated on 11 March 2004 in Bangkok, Thailand.

2003 April - P. T. Pan Asia Logistics Indonesia established.

2003 March - Pan Asia Logistics (Korea) Ltd was incorporated on 7 March 2003 in Seoul, Korea.

2003 January - Pan Asia Freight-Forwarding & Logistics Hong Kong Limited was incorporated on 29 January 2003 in Hong Kong.

2002 December - Legal establishment of Pan Asia Logistics Singapore Pte Ltd was incorporated on 27 December 2002 in Singapore.

Gallery

References

External links
Transport Company

Logistics companies of Singapore
Transport companies established in 2002